Tam Cốc-Bích Động is a popular tourist destination in north Vietnam and part of the Tràng An Scenic Landscape Complex UNESCO World Heritage site. It is located in Ninh Binh province, near the village of Tam Cốc. The closest city is Ninh Binh. It consists of two distinct attractions: Tam Cốc, a flooded cave karst system; and Bích Động, a series of mountain pagodas.

Tam Cốc 

Tam Cốc, literally "three caves", consists of three natural caves — Hang Cả, Hang Hai, and Hang Ba — on the Ngô Đồng River. Tourists are taken in small boats along the river from the village of Ván Lám, through rice fields and limestone karsts, through the caves, and back. Local women serve as guides and attempt to sell embroidered goods to their passengers. The guides are well known for rowing their boats using their feet.

The area is nicknamed "the inland Ha Long Bay".

Bích Động 

Bích Động is a pagoda complex, built in 1428. It is situated on nearby Ngu Nhac Mountain, and consists of three separate pagodas: Hạ, Trung, and Thượng Pagodas, in ascending order. Guided tours generally cover historical points and end with a view from the top.

References

Tourist attractions in Vietnam
Caves of Vietnam
Landforms of Ninh Bình province
Tourist attractions in Ninh Bình province